Without a Net is the eighth live album by the Grateful Dead (their twenty-first overall). It compiles performances from October 1989 to April 1990, and was released in September 1990. The album simulates the progression of an actual Grateful Dead concert and was certified Gold by the RIAA in November 1990. It is the final contemporary live album that was released in their career.

Background
The Grateful Dead's albums had frustrated critics and fans alike for neither approaching nor accurately representing the band's live concert sound and experience—to the point that band-approved, fan-made tapes were preferred to official releases. The band's organization had poured profits into sound reinforcement and cutting-edge technology for their concert performances and were likewise frustrated by the seeming shortfall in capturing their sound on album.

With the advent of digital technology, Without a Net was the band's first contemporary live project in nine years, and featured selections from then-recent tours in an attempt to allow the home listener a closer facsimile of the band's engulfing sound system. Touting the advancement in production clarity, the accompanying shrink wrap sticker proclaimed: "The world's grandest, largest, best live recording."

The resulting album achieved gold-status sales within weeks of its release—the first live album by the band to do so. A series of live releases followed, beginning with a complete concert performance in its entirety. The release of archival live performances continued after the 1995 dissolution of the band and is ongoing.

Content and packaging
The album title uses the idiom metaphorically, alluding to the band's disinclination for prepared set lists. They preferred just to play and let the song choice evolve by sense for each performance, pulling from a repertoire of over 100 then-common songs. In keeping with that notion, the packaging used a circus theme, with a "Big Top Limited Edition" also-available, featuring clowns and related artwork. The album's dedication to Clifton Hanger is a reference to keyboardist Brent Mydland, who used the alias for hotel registration. Mydland died before the album's release.

The album is an attempt to compile some of the best performances from then-recent tours and present them as a prototypical Grateful Dead concert, as they sounded at that time. However, Mydland's death and the subsequent addition of Vince Welnick and Bruce Hornsby had changed the band's live sound by the time the album was available. Seventeen songs were chosen from two of the most recent tours and sequenced to represent typical set placement (though the traditional "Drums" solo and "Space" improvisation are absent, and the final "encore" track is given an early fade out).

Track listing

Notes

The vinyl pressing puts "Bird Song" before "One More Saturday Night" instead of after "Cassidy"

Personnel
 Jerry Garcia – guitar, vocals
 Bob Weir – guitar, vocals
 Brent Mydland – keyboards, vocals
 Phil Lesh – bass guitar, vocals
 Bill Kreutzmann – drums
 Mickey Hart – drums

Additional musician
 Branford Marsalis – tenor and soprano saxophones on "Eyes of the World"

Charts

References 

1990 live albums
Albums produced by Phil Lesh
Arista Records live albums
Grateful Dead live albums